CNM can refer to:

 CNM, IATA code for Cavern City Air Terminal, Carlsbad, New Mexico, US
 CNM, station code for Cheltenham Spa railway station in Cheltenham, UK
 cnm, ISO 639-3 code for the Chuj language
 Central New Mexico Community College, in Albuquerque, New Mexico, US
 Centronuclear myopathy, a congenital muscle disorder
 Certified Nurse‐Midwife, an American nursing certification
 Chetna Natya Manch, the "cultural troupe" of the Communist Party of India (Maoist)
 Consensual non-monogamy, a style of sexual relationship